Daniel Zachary Brunskill (born January 27, 1994) is an American football center for the Tennessee Titans of the National Football League (NFL). He played college football at San Diego State.

Early years
Brunskill played as a tight end for Valley Center High School in Valley Center, CA where received an award for all-league in the lineman category under Coach Rob Gilster.

Professional career

Atlanta Falcons
Brunskill signed with the Atlanta Falcons as an undrafted free agent on May 1, 2017. He was waived by the Falcons on September 2, 2017, but was signed to the practice squad the next day. He signed a reserve/future contract with the Falcons on January 15, 2018.

On September 1, 2018, Brunskill was waived by the Falcons and was signed to the practice squad the next day.

San Diego Fleet (AAF)
In January 2019, Brunskill joined the San Diego Fleet of the newly formed Alliance of American Football.

San Francisco 49ers

On April 11, 2019, Brunskill signed with the San Francisco 49ers. Brunskill reached Super Bowl LIV with the 49ers, but they lost 31–20 to the Kansas City Chiefs.

On March 20, 2020, Brunskill was re-signed to a one-year contract with the 49ers.

The 49ers placed a one-year exclusive-rights free agent tender on Brunskill on March 12, 2021. He signed the contract on April 13. He was named the 49ers starting right guard, and started all 17 games.

On March 15, 2022, the 49ers placed a restricted free agent tender on Brunskill, which he signed a month later.

Tennessee Titans
On March 19, 2023, Brunskill signed a two-year, $5.5 million contract with the Tennessee Titans.

References

External links
San Diego State Aztecs bio
San Francisco 49ers bio

1994 births
Living people
American football offensive tackles
Atlanta Falcons players
People from Valley Center, California
Players of American football from California
San Diego Fleet players
San Diego State Aztecs football players
San Francisco 49ers players
Sportspeople from San Diego County, California